Emma Kreisz (born 2 September 2003) is a Hungarian ice hockey player and member of the Hungarian national team, currently playing in the North American Prep Hockey Association (NAPHA) with the varsity team of Stanstead College. She is committed to playing college ice hockey as an incoming freshman for the 2023–24 season with the Minnesota Golden Gophers women's ice hockey program in the Western Collegiate Hockey Association (WCHA) conference of the NCAA Division I.

Kreisz represented Hungary at the 2021 IIHF Women's World Championship. As a member of the Hungarian national under-18 team, she participated in the Division 1 Group A tournaments of the IIHF Women's U18 World Championships in 2018, 2019, and 2020, serving as team captain in both 2019 and 2020.

Career statistics

International

References

External links
 

2003 births
Living people
Expatriate ice hockey players in Canada
Hungarian expatriate sportspeople in Canada
Hungarian women's ice hockey forwards
Ice hockey people from Budapest
MAC Budapest (women) players
Stanstead College alumni